The Liverpool Plinth is an art space that showcases sculptures for a 12-month period on a plinth outside Liverpool Parish Church in Liverpool, UK. The Liverpool Plinth, in the mould of Trafalgar Square’s Fourth Plinth, occupies a prominent position overlooking Chapel Street and Liverpool’s waterfront. It laid empty since the removal of Brian Burgess’s “Christ on a Donkey” several years ago.

First set up in 2018, each sculpture is chosen via a competition open to artists living or working in the north of England (North West, North East, Yorkshire and the Humber). The winner receives £1000.

The project was set up by Liverpool BID Company, working with Liverpool Parish Church along with city gallery and art organisation, dot-art.

Winners

References

Outdoor sculptures in England